Ten Days Without Mom is a 2017 Argentine comedy film directed by Ariel Winograd and starring Diego Peretti and Carla Peterson.

Plot 
Vera Garbo, a saturated housewife, takes a vacation and moves away from her family, consisting of her husband Victor, who lives only for work, and their four children. Now that she is not with them, the family realizes how much they need her.

Cast

Trailer 
On 11 May 2017, a second preview or trailer for the film was released confirming that the release date in Argentina would be 6 July 6 2017, according to production company Patagonik.

References

External links 
 Ten Days Without Mom at Cine Nacional 
 

2017 comedy films
Argentine comedy films
2010s Spanish-language films
Films set in Buenos Aires
2010s Argentine films